Calyptoliva bolis is a species of sea snail, a marine gastropod mollusk in the family Olividae, the olives.

Distribution
This species occurs in the Coral Sea

References

 Kantor, Y. & Bouchet, P., 2007. Out of Australia: Belloliva (Neogastropoda: Olividae) in the Coral Sea and New Caledonia. American Malacological Bulletin 22: 27-73

Olividae
Gastropods described in 2007